Kim Sae-ron (born July 31, 2000) is a South Korean actress. She began her career when she was nine years old and became a popular child star through the films A Brand New Life (2009) and The Man From Nowhere (2010). As Kim reached her teenage years, she was cast in more leading roles, notably in the film A Girl at My Door (2014). She has also starred in television drama series, including Can You Hear My Heart (2011), The Queen's Classroom (2013) and Hi! School-Love On (2014). Her first adult lead role was in the television drama Mirror of the Witch (2016).

Awards and nominations

Others

Notes

References

Lists of awards received by South Korean actor